Russian pyramid, also known as Russian billiards, is a form of billiards played on a large billiard table with narrow pockets. It is popular across Eastern Europe as well as countries of the former Soviet Union/Eastern Bloc. In Western countries, the game is known as pyramid billiards, or simply pyramid within professional circles.

Equipment
Table: Playing-surface sizes vary. Smaller sizes as used by other cue sports are also found in less-formal venues. The  used in Russian pyramid tables are typically much thinner than those of pool and snooker tables, but is occasionally heated, similar to carom billiards tables.
They are typically larger and heavier than other types of billiard balls. The old tournament size was 68 mm in diameter.
This requires great precision to pocket a ball in such tight pockets.
Cues: Due to larger ball size, the cues used for Russian pyramid are slightly thicker and heavier than those of pool cues, and the tip diameter is wider (up to 15 mm), in comparison to 10–13 mm used in pool cues.

Rule variations

There are several rule variations of Russian pyramid. In addition, shots do not have to be .
Depending on the game variant some specific balls may have to be in specific positions within the rack.
The most common varieties are the following, each of which has slight local variations on the rules:
Free pyramid (also known as American pyramid)
Any ball may be used as the cue ball. Players can pocket the ball they struck if it hits another ball first, with the goal being to  the struck ball off of one or more other balls into a pocket.

Dynamic pyramid (also known as Siberian pyramid or Nevsky pyramid)
Only one ball is the cue ball. Players can pocket the cue ball with a carom shot off another ball and then the scorer must choose an object ball to be taken off the table. The player then has  and may place it anywhere on the table but may not pocket it until the next stroke, otherwise it is a foul.

Combined pyramid (also known as Moscow pyramid or combo pyramid)

Classical pyramid
Rules are similar to fifteen-ball pool. The object is to score at least 71 points. For each correctly pocketed object ball, the player wins the number of points on the ball (except for 1-ball, which scores 11 points). The last remaining ball on the table, regardless of its number, is worth 10 points. The total number of points is 130.

14.1 pyramid (also known as straight pyramid or long pyramid)
Rules are very similar to free pyramid except it continues after potting eight balls until 14 balls are pocketed, similar to straight pool, which 14 balls are respotted into an incomplete pyramid. The objective is to score at least a given number of points.

Scratch pyramid (also known as SVOI)
Similar to free pyramid, but pocketing object balls before the cue ball is a foul, therefore the player must pocket the cue ball after hitting object balls, which in this case, other balls can be pocketed as long as the cue ball is potted first.

In popular culture
Versions of the game have featured prominently in notable Russian films such as The Meeting Place Cannot Be Changed (1979) and The New Adventures of the Elusive Avengers (1968). An episode of the popular animated television series Kikoriki has two characters playing the game. The main characters of Dead Man's Bluff, or Zhmurki (Russian: Жмурки) play Russian pool in the bar scene.

A Russian pool configuration can be seen in “Tulsa King” starring Sylvester Stallone in Season 1, episode 5, while making a phone call, he walks up to a pool table, and around it. You will notice the all white balls racked, and a white cue ball.

Russian pyramid has been adapted into video games, both in standalone form and as a play mode in multi-cue sports video games. Many recent releases have been mobile games for Android and iOS.

"Russian pool"

Colored numbered balls for playing eight-ball, nine-ball and other pool games on Russian billiards tables are also produced. The balls are 68 mm ( in) in diameter, like the standard ones for Russian pyramid, and thus much larger than the American-style balls they are patterned after (as illustrated in the comparison image).

WPA World Pyramid Championship
Sanctioned by the World Pool-Billiard Association (WPA).

References

Cue sports
Sports originating in Russia